Argyresthia alternatella is a moth of the  family Yponomeutidae. It is found in North America, including Arkansas, Kentucky, Maryland, Massachusetts, Mississippi, New Jersey, Ohio, Oklahoma, Ontario, Quebec and Texas.

The wingspan is 10–12 mm. The forewings are golden-ochreous. There are five brown spots on the costa and three similar spots on the dorsal margin. There is also a streak of brown on the dorsum at the base and the apex of the wing is lightly reticulated with this colour. The hindwings are light fuscous.

The larvae feed on Juniperus species. Young larvae bore into the seed of their host plant while the seed-coat is still soft. They consume many of the seeds. Full-grown larvae feed on the fleshy portion of the berries. Pupation usually takes place outside of the berry in a white, silken cocoon.

References

Moths described in 1908
Argyresthia
Moths of North America